Dietrick (pronounced "dee-trik") is both a given name and a surname. Notable people with the name include:

Given name
 Dietrick Lamade (1859–1938), American publisher and founder of the newspaper Grit

Surname
 Blake Dietrick (born 1993), American basketball player
 Coby Dietrick (born 1948), American basketball player
 Ellen Battelle Dietrick (1847–1895), American author and suffragist

See also
Dietrick Hall (building)
Dietrich